Elections to Kesteven County Council were held on Saturday, 11 April 1964. Kesteven was one of three divisions of the historic county of Lincolnshire in England; it consisted of the ancient wapentakes (or hundreds) of Aswardhurn, Aveland, Beltisloe, Boothby Graffoe, Flaxwell, Langoe, Loveden, Ness, and Winnibriggs and Threo. The Local Government Act 1888 established Kesteven as an administrative county, governed by a Council; elections were held every three years from 1889, until it was abolished by the Local Government Act 1972, which established Lincolnshire County Council in its place.

The county was divided into 60 electoral divisions, each of which returned one member. In 1964 there were contests in 5 of these.

Results by division 

Source: "Vicar unseats a retiring member", Sleaford Standard, 17 April 1964, p. 13.

By-elections

Claypole, 1964 
Following Brigadier Frank McCallum's election to the aldermanic bench when the new council was formed, a casual vacancy arose in the Claypole division. Two candidates were nominated: Sybilla Mary McCallum, the brigadier's wife, and Wing Commander A. E. F. McCreary. An election was held on 25 July 1964. The results were as follows:

Sybilla McCallum was returned with a majority of 178 (37%). The turnout was 47%.

Corby, 1964 
Following J. H. Lewis's election as an alderman when the new council was formed, a casual vacancy arose in the Corby division. Two candidates were nominated: Harold W. Bailey, of Swayfield, and C. John Pope, of Castle Bytham. Both were farmers and members of South Kesteven Rural District Council, of which both had served as chairman (Bailey twice). An election was held on 25 July 1964. The results were as follows:

Bailey was returned with a majority of 68 (15%). The turnout was 45%.

Uffington, 1965 
C. B. Snodgrass, who had been returned for the Uffington division in the 1964 elections, resigned due to ill health in 1965. The Rev. Peter E. Fluck, the rector of Uffington, was the only person nominated to fill this vacancy. He was duly returned unopposed as councillor for the division in July 1965.

References

Notes

Citations

1964
1964 English local elections
20th century in Lincolnshire